Chegdomyn is an urban locality (a work settlement) and the administrative center of Verkhnebureinsky District of Khabarovsk Krai, Russia. Population:

History
Chegdomyn was founded in 1939, with the beginning of black coal mining in the area.  At the same time, construction of a branch line from the Trans-Siberian Railway at Isvestkovaya to Chegdomyn was begun, although it was dismantled during World War II and its tracks reused in construction projects closer to the front.

After the end of the war, the railway was rebuilt, opening in 1951. Coal mining resumed in 1948, and Chegdomyn was granted urban-type settlement status in 1949.

Geography
The settlement is situated in the Bureya River basin, just north of the Baikal-Amur Mainline (BAM). A branch line connects Chegdomyn to Novy Urgal on the BAM. It is located in the valley of the Chegdomyn River, near its confluence with the Urgal.

Climate
Chegdomyn has a monsoon-influenced humid continental/subarctic climate (Köppen Dwb/Dwc) with severely cold, dry winters and rather warm, rainy summers.

Chegdomyn is as cold a climate gets in the world while still meeting the requirements for not being subarctic. This is due to the location being far enough inland to experience severe cold from the Siberian High in winter and to build up warmth in late spring, while at the same time being near the coast to extend summers. In spring, the gain is almost as rapid. With peak winter being quite dry, the most snow accumulation usually later in the season due to the weakening of the high-pressure systems in favour of more humid air masses. In summer, temperatures are often moderated by the frequent rainfall, but are still warm for the latitude at about  average highs.

Economy
The settlement's main industry remains coal mining by Urgalugol, now owned by the Siberian Coal Energy Company. There is also some timber production in the surrounding area.

Transportation

Notable people
 
 
Maksim Gerasin (born 1974), Russian professional football coach and former player

References

External links
Chegdomyn Information portal
Website of Chegdomyn 

Urban-type settlements in Khabarovsk Krai
Monotowns in Russia